The 2010 Asian Junior Badminton Championships is an Asia continental junior championships to crown the best U-19 badminton players across Asia. It was the 13th tournament of the Asian Junior Badminton Championships, and held in Kuala Lumpur, Malaysia from 24–28 March.

Venue
Stadium Juara, Bukit Kiara Sports Complex, Kuala Lumpur.

Medalists

Medal count

References

External links
Asia Youth Under 19 2010 (Kuala Lumpur) Individual at tournamentsoftware.com
Asia Youth Under 19 Championships 2010 (Kuala Lumpur) Mixed Team at tournamentsoftware.com

2010 in badminton
2010
2010 in Malaysian sport
Junior Asian
Sport in Kuala Lumpur
2010 in youth sport